Siege artillery (also siege guns or siege cannons) are heavy guns designed to bombard fortifications, cities, and other fixed targets. They are distinct from field artillery and are a class of siege weapon capable of firing heavy cannonballs or shells that required enormous transport and logistical support to operate. They lacked mobility and thus were rarely useful in more mobile warfare situations, generally having been superseded by heavy howitzers (towed and self-propelled artillery), strategic bomber aircraft, surface-to-surface missiles, ballistic missiles, cruise missiles and multiple rocket launchers in modern warfare.

Muzzle-loading artillery

Breech-loading artillery

See also 
List of the largest cannon by caliber

 
Siege
Large-calibre artillery